Jorge Lozano and Todd Witsken were the defending champions but lost in the first round to Rikard Bergh and Nicolás Pereira.

Jim Courier and Pete Sampras won in the final 6–4, 6–3 against Danilo Marcelino and Mauro Menezes.

Seeds

Draw

Final

Top half

Bottom half

External links
 1989 Italian Open Men's doubles draw

Men's Doubles